Cletus Apul Avoka (born 20 November 1951) is Ghanaian lawyer, politician and member of the Parliament of Ghana representing the Zebilla East constituency in the Upper East region.

He was the majority leader of the parliament during his time in office and also once served as the Minister of Interior and Minister for Lands and Forestry.

Early life and education 
Cletus Apul Avoka was born 30 November 1951. He hails from Teshie near Zebilla, Upper East Region. He attended Navrongo Secondary School and the University of Ghana where he obtained his L.L.B in 1976. He also attended Ghana School of Law where he obtained his Bachelor of Law degree in 1978.

Political career 
After the 2012 general elections, he was replaced by Benjamin Kunbuor for the 6th Parliament of the 4th Republic as Majority Leader. He was the Minister for Interior in the National Democratic Congress government of John Atta Mills in Ghana until January 2010.

His first ministerial position was as Minister for Lands and Forestry in the government of Jerry Rawlings. He was formerly the Member of Parliament for Bawku West constituency in the Upper East region of Ghana from 1993 to 2005.

In the 2008 parliamentary election, he re-entered parliament as the second MP for the Zebilla constituency and assumed office in January 2009.

2000 elections 
Avoka was also the MP for Garu Tempane from 2000 to 2004. In the year 2000, he won the general elections as the member of parliament for the Garu-Tempane constituency of the Upper East Region of Ghana. He won as an independent candidate in that election for the Upper East Region. Akudibila was elected with 14,282 valid votes cast.

This was equivalent to 45.40% of the total valid votes cast. He was elected over William Azuma Dominic of the National Democratic Congress, William Pullam of the Peoples National Convention Party, Emmanuel S.N.Asigri of the New Patriotic Party, Tindogo D.Ashock of the Convention Peoples Party, Halid M.Yussif of the United Ghana Movement and Hamidu Sahanona of the National Reform Party.

These acquired 12,224, 2,908, 1,360, 293, 246,138 votes out of the total valid votes cast respectively. These were equivalent to 38.90%, 9.20%, 4.30%,0.90%, 0.80%, 0.40% respectively of total valid votes cast.

During the 2008 Ghanaian general elections, he polled 13,074 votes out of the 32,215 valid votes cast representing 40.50% over Appiah Moses who polled 10,470 votes representing 32.50%, John Akparibo who polled 6,701 votes representing 20.80%, Sulley Awanni Agholisi who polled 1,461 votes representing 4.54%, Azumah Yusif Ndago who polled 273 votes representing 0.85% and Atiah kudugu who polled 236 votes representing 0.73%

He won again in the 2012 Ghanaian general elections with 21,900 votes out of the 41,106 valid votes cast representing 53.28% over Frank Fuseini Adongo who polled 17,082 votes representing 41.56%, Mallam Yusuf Isa who polled 1,739 votes representing 4.23% and Atangnaba Abraham who polled 385 votes representing 0.94%

Personal life 
Avoka is a Catholic Christian and is married with four children.

See also 
 List of Mills government ministers

References

External links 
 Profile on Ghana parliament website

Living people
Ghanaian MPs 1993–1997
Ghanaian MPs 1997–2001
Ghanaian MPs 2001–2005
Ghanaian MPs 2009–2013
Ghanaian MPs 2013–2017
Government ministers of Ghana
Environment ministers of Ghana
Interior ministers of Ghana
National Democratic Congress (Ghana) politicians
Ghana School of Law alumni
1951 births
20th-century Ghanaian lawyers
Ghanaian Roman Catholics
People from Upper East Region
21st-century Ghanaian politicians
Ghanaian MPs 2021–2025